JFH may refer to:
 JFH: Justice For Hire
 Jimmy Floyd Hasselbaink
 Joint Force Harrier